Boeheim's Army are an American basketball team that participates in The Basketball Tournament (TBT), an annual winner-take-all single-elimination tournament. The team's roster consists of professional basketball players who compete outside of the NBA, most of whom played college basketball for the Syracuse Orange men's basketball team. The TBT team is an independent entity that is named after Jim Boeheim, longtime coach of the college team. Boeheim's Army first played in the tournament in 2015; in 2021, they won the championship and a $1 million prize.

History

2015 
In TBT 2015, the team was seeded no. 1 in the Northeast Regional and received a first-round bye.

2016 
In TBT 2016, the team was seeded no. 2 in the Northeast Regional.

2017 

For TBT 2017, the team was seeded no. 3 in the Northeast Region.

2018 
For TBT 2018, the team was seeded no. 1 in the Northeast Region.

2019 
For TBT 2019, the team was seeded no. 1 in the Syracuse Regional.

2020 
For TBT 2020, the team was the no. 3 overall seed in a field reduced to 24 teams due to the COVID-19 pandemic, and received a first-round bye.

2021 

For TBT 2021, the team was seeded no. 3 in the Illinois Regional.

2022
For TBT 2022, the team was seeded no. 1 in the Syracuse Regional.

Record by years

Awards

References

External links 
Team page

Basketball teams in the United States
The Basketball Tournament teams
Basketball teams established in 2015
Syracuse Orange men's basketball